Shingo Kunieda defeated the defending champion Michaël Jérémiasz in the final, 6–3, 3–6, 6–3 to win the men's singles wheelchair tennis title at the 2007 Australian Open. It was his first major singles title, and the first of an eventual record 28 such titles.

Seeds
All seeds receive a bye into the second round.

Draw

Finals

Top half

Bottom half

Source and link
 Draws

Wheelchair Men's Singles